The Basketball competitions in the 1979 Summer Universiade were held in Mexico City, Mexico.

Men's competition

Final standings and results

Women's competition

Final standings and results

References
https://web.archive.org/web/20100116184925/http://sports123.com/bsk/wun.html
https://web.archive.org/web/20100116184920/http://sports123.com/bsk/mun.html
https://www.usab.com/history/world-university-games-mens/tenth-world-university-games-1979.aspx (Men's)
https://www.usab.com/history/world-university-games-womens/tenth-world-university-games-1979-1.aspx (Women's)

Basketball
Summer Universiade
1979
Universiade